Graffiti Junktion is an American independent chain of restaurants located throughout Florida, USA, with 13 locations, since its founding in 2008. The restaurant contains the graffiti arts that drawn all over. The place serves American foods, such as burgers, hotdogs, chicken, etc.

External links
 Graffiti Junktion website
 Graffiti Junktion Facebook Page

Restaurant chains in the United States
Companies based in Orlando, Florida
Restaurants in Florida